Rufus Crosby Kemper Sr. (1892–1972) was an American banker. He is known for expanding City Center Bank, acquired by his father, from a three-man operation with $600,000 in deposits into UMB Financial Corporation, with $300 million in deposits, during his tenure from 1919 to September 1967.

Kemper is a great-grand-uncle of actress Ellie Kemper (born 1980).

Early life
Rufus Crosby Kemper was born in 1892 in Valley Falls, Kansas. His father, William Thornton Kemper Sr., bought City Center Bank (which was founded in 1913) during World War I.

Career
William first appointed Crosby's younger brother James M. Kemper president of the bank in 1919. However, James resigned a month later and went on to become president of rival Commerce Bancshares. Rufus became president of the bank, a position he held until 1959, when his son R. Crosby Kemper Jr. took over. William remained a director until September 1967.

Philanthropy
Kemper contributed substantially to philanthropies in the Kansas City Metropolitan Area and Kemper Arena is named for him.

Crosby also served as a regent at Rockhurst University, president of Interstate Securities, and director of Kansas City Title & Trust Company.

External links
 

1892 births
1972 deaths
People from Jefferson County, Kansas
People from the Kansas City metropolitan area
University of Missouri alumni
American bankers
R. Crosby